By-elections to the 40th Canadian Parliament were held to fill vacancies in the House of Commons of Canada between the 2008 federal election and the 2011 federal election. The Conservative Party of Canada led a minority government for the entirety of the 40th Canadian Parliament, with little change from by-elections.

Ten seats became vacant during the life of the Parliament. Seven of these vacancies were filled through by-elections, and three seats remained vacant when the 2011 federal election was called.

Overview

2009
Four by-elections to fill vacant seats in the House of Commons were held on November 9, 2009. Governor General Michaëlle Jean, acting on the advice of Prime Minister Stephen Harper, issued writs of election for the by-elections on October 4. All four vacancies were caused by resignations.

New Westminster—Coquitlam
The riding of New Westminster—Coquitlam had been vacant since April 13, when Dawn Black resigned to run in the British Columbia provincial election.

 
| style="text-align:left;" colspan="2"|New Democrat hold
|align="right"|

Cumberland—Colchester—Musquodoboit Valley
The riding of Cumberland—Colchester—Musquodoboit Valley had been vacant since April 30, 2009, when Bill Casey resigned to accept a posting from the provincial government of Nova Scotia.

Scott Armstrong was nominated unopposed by the Conservatives. Farmer Jim Burrows defeated 2008 Liberal candidate Tracy Parsons for the Liberal nomination on September 12, 2009.

 
| style="text-align:left;" colspan="2"|Conservative gain from Independent
|align="right"|

Montmagny—L'Islet—Kamouraska—Rivière-du-Loup
The riding of Montmagny—L'Islet—Kamouraska—Rivière-du-Loup had been vacant since May 21, when Paul Crête resigned to run as a Parti Québécois candidate in the provincial Rivière-du-Loup by-election.
 
According to the Regina Leader-Post, Bernard Généreux won the by-election.

 
| style="text-align:left;" colspan="2"|Conservative gain from Bloc Québécois
|align="right"|

Hochelaga
On June 25, 2009, Réal Ménard announced that he would resign from the Hochelaga constituency effective September 16 to run as a Vision Montreal candidate for borough mayor of Mercier–Hochelaga-Maisonneuve in the fall 2009 municipal elections in Montreal.

Daniel Paillé won the by-election according to CBC News.

2010
Three by-elections were held on November 29, 2010, in order to fill vacancies in the House of Commons of Canada for two seats in Manitoba and one seat in Ontario. Until pre-empted by the issuance of writs for the 41st federal election, a further three by-elections were pending for one seat in Alberta, one seat in Quebec and one seat in British Columbia.

Background
The three seats were vacant due to the resignations of Inky Mark, Judy Wasylycia-Leis, and Maurizio Bevilacqua from the House of Commons. The incumbents had resigned their seats to run for the mayoralty of their hometowns in municipal elections. Bevilacqua was subsequently elected mayor of Vaughan, Ontario while Wasylycia-Leis and Mark were defeated in their attempts. A further three seats, Calgary Centre-North, Haute-Gaspésie—La Mitis—Matane—Matapédia and Prince George—Peace River also became vacant in late October or November, however these vacancies occurred too late to be included in the November 29 by-election call.

Timing
Under Canadian election law, a by-election must be formally announced no earlier than 11 days and no later than 180 days after a vacancy officially takes effect. Due to the timing of the respective resignations, this means that the date of the Winnipeg North by-election had to be announced by October 27, while the scheduling period for all of the other four by-elections extended into 2011. Consequently, the Winnipeg North by-election had to be called at least a week before the window opened in which Prince George—Peace River and Haute-Gaspésie—La Mitis—Matane—Matapédia by-elections could be called.

When multiple vacancies exist, it is customary, though not mandatory, for by-elections to be held on the same date.

Dauphin—Swan River—Marquette
A by-election was held in the Manitoba federal riding of Dauphin—Swan River—Marquette as incumbent MP Inky Mark resigned effective September 15, 2010 as the Conservative Party of Canada Member of Parliament in order to run unsuccessfully for mayor of Dauphin, Manitoba.

| style="text-align:left;" colspan="2"|Conservative hold
|align="right"|

Vaughan
A by-election was held in the Ontario federal riding of Vaughan as Liberal Maurizio Bevilacqua resigned to run successfully for mayor of Vaughan, Ontario.

| style="text-align:left;" colspan="2"|Conservative gain from Liberal
|align="right"|

Winnipeg North
A by-election was held in the Manitoba federal riding of Winnipeg North after New Democratic Party MP Judy Wasylycia-Leis resigned to run unsuccessfully for Mayor of Winnipeg. The seat had been vacant for almost seven months by the time of the vote.

With the addition of the Pirate Party candidate Jeff Coleman, the by-election in Winnipeg North marked the first election or by-election to run a member of the Pirate Party outside of Europe.

| style="text-align:left;" colspan="2"|Liberal gain from New Democrat
|align="right"|

2011

Cancelled by-elections
Until pre-empted by the issuance of writs for the 41st federal election, three federal by-elections were pending in 2011 to fill vacant seats in the House of Commons.

Calgary Centre-North
A by-election call was pending in the Alberta federal riding of Calgary Centre-North, where Conservative MP Jim Prentice announced on November 4, 2010 he was resigning as Environment Minister effective immediately and that he would be resigning as Member of Parliament for Calgary Centre-North by the end of the year to take a job as vice-chairman of the Canadian Imperial Bank of Commerce. Prentice resigned as the Conservative Member of Parliament for Calgary Centre-North on November 14, 2010. The Prime Minister theoretically had until May 2, 2011 to call a by-election.

Soon after the announcement of Prentice's impending resignation, both Ric McIver and Barb Higgins – the second and third place mayoralty finishers in the 2010 municipal election in Calgary – expressed interest in running for the Conservative Party nomination in Calgary Centre-North. Current Calgary-Foothills MLA Len Webber and recent aldermanic candidate Sean Chu were also rumored to be testing the waters.  Ultimately, university administrator and Calgary—Nose Hill riding president Michelle Rempel was acclaimed as the Conservative candidate on December 17, 2010.

Former Ontario Liberal MP Robert Nault and former mayor of Calgary Dave Bronconnier were rumored to be seeking the Liberal nomination. However, Liberal leader Michael Ignatieff appointed Stephen Randall – a University of Calgary professor and the former dean of the Faculty of Social Sciences – as the party's candidate on January 6, 2011.

Heather MacIntosh was nominated to replace Dr. Eric Donovan as the Green Party candidate after winning a three way nomination contest on October 26, 2010.

Haute-Gaspésie—La Mitis—Matane—Matapédia
A by-election was pending in the Quebec federal riding of Haute-Gaspésie—La Mitis—Matane—Matapédia, where Bloc Québécois MP Jean-Yves Roy resigned on October 22, 2010 as a result of chronic health problems. The Prime Minister theoretically had until April 20, 2011 to drop the writ for a by-election in that riding.

Prince George—Peace River
A by-election was pending in the British Columbia federal riding of Prince George—Peace River due to the resignation of Conservative MP Jay Hill on October 25, 2010.  Prime Minister Harper had until April 22, 2011 to call a by-election.

Notably, in his resignation announcement Hill appeared to suggest that he expected the 41st federal election to be called before a by-election could take place in this riding. He was correct; the Harper government lost a confidence motion on March 25, 2011, triggering an election.

Persons seeking the Conservative Party nomination were former Prince George mayor Colin Kinsley, Tumbler Ridge councilor Jerrilyn Schembri, Prince George city councilor Cameron Stolz, Fort St. John councillors Don Irwin and Dan Davies and Conservative riding association CEO Bob Zimmer. Bob Zimmer was declared the Conservative candidate following a March 11, 2011 nomination meeting in Prince George.

Hilary Crowley was announced as the Green Party candidate on November 12, 2010. Former Deputy Premier and Prince George area MLA, Lois Boone as acclaimed as the NDP candidate on November 27, 2010.

On March 28, 2011, lawyer Ben Levine was nominated as the Liberal candidate.

See also
List of federal by-elections in Canada

References

2009 elections in Canada
2010 elections in Canada
40th
40th Canadian Parliament